Genius 2000 is the fourth studio album by Japanese recording artist Namie Amuro, released on January 26, 2000, through Avex Trax. The album was released three years after her last album, Concentration 20 (1997), and was produced by Tetsuya Komuro and Dallas Austin, marking her first collaboration with an American producer, the album spawned four singles: "I Have Never Seen", "Respect the Power of Love", "Something 'bout the Kiss" and "Love 2000".

Upon its release, Genius 2000 debuted at number one on the Oricon Weekly Albums Chart with 536,000 copies sold. It became her fourth studio album and fifth overall to top the chart, but had the lowest first week sales of her career at the time. The album has sold over 800,000 copies and has been certified 2× Platinum by the RIAJ in February 2000.

Only 11 months after the album's release, Amuro released her fifth studio album, Break the Rules.

Singles and tie-ins 
The album's first single, "I Have Never Seen", was released 13 months before the album, on December 23, 1998. The single marked her return to the entertainment industry following her maternity leave and was her last number one single until 60s 70s 80s almost 10 years later.

The second single, "Respect the Power of Love", was released on the same day that Amuro's mother was murdered, causing the singer to cancel promotion for the single.

"Something 'bout the Kiss", produced by Dallas Austin, was released in September and was Amuro's first single to be produced by Austin.

The final single, "Love 2000", was released on New Year's Day in 2000, preceding the album by three weeks.

The album contains the songs which Komuro produced with American musicians, and the songs which Dallas Austin produced. Musically, it shows that Amuro's interest shifted towards hip-hop and R&B. It also features a duet with American boy band Imajin, titled "You Are the One".

The song "Things I Collected" would be covered by Tamia for the soundtrack of Diary of a Mad Black Woman. Tamia's version of the song omits the acoustic guitar solo, but otherwise is identical to Namie's version.

Track listing

Personnel
 Namie Amuro - vocals, background vocals
 Imajin - vocals, background vocals
 Terry Bradford - background vocals
 Alex Brown - background vocals
 Sheila E. - background vocals, drums, percussion
 Kiyoshi Hiyama - background vocals
 Yuko Kawai - background vocals
 Debra Killings - background vocals, bass guitar
 David Lawson - background vocals
 Maxayn Lewis - background vocals
 Lynn Mabry - background vocals
 Minako Obata - background vocals
 Takeo Saito - background vocals
 Kenji Sano - background vocals
 Naoki Takao - background vocals
 Will Wheaton Jr. - background vocals
 Tetsuya Komuro - acoustic piano, keyboard, synthesizer
 Tomi Martin - guitar
 Kazuhiro Matsuo - bass, guitar
 Chiharu Mikuzuki - bass
 Renato Neto - keyboard
 Ramon Stagnaro - guitar
 Michael Thompson - guitar

Production
 Producers - Dallas Austin, Tetsuya Komuro
 Mixing - Mike Butler, Alvin Speights
 Mixing Assistant - Skye A.K. Correa
 Midi & Sound Design - Rick Sheppard 
 Vocal Direction - Kenji Sano
 Photography - Itaru Hirama
 Art Direction - Tycoon Graphics

Charts
Album - Oricon Sales Chart (Japan)

Singles - Oricon Sales Chart (Japan)

Total Single Sales:  1,754,750

Total Album and Single Sales:  2,557,490

References

Namie Amuro albums
2000 albums
Avex Group albums
Albums produced by Tetsuya Komuro
Albums produced by Dallas Austin